Ripp rapp is the fourth studio album by Swedish rock artist Ulf Lundell and was released on September 4, 1979, through Parlophone. It was produced by Lasse Lindbom, Lundell and Kjell Andersson. The album has sold platinum in Sweden.

The album was reissued in 1998 in a remastered version with extra tracks.

Track listing

Personnel
 Ulf Lundell - vocals, guitar, piano, harmonica
 Lasse Lindbom - vocals, guitar, percussion, bass
 Janne Andersson - guitar, vocals
 Ingmar “Sture” Dunker - drums
 Roffe Färdigh - guitar
 Hasse Breitholtz - Steinway, vocals
 Peter Lindroth - electric piano
 Kjell Öhman - orgel, Polymoog, accordion
 Stefan Nilsson - Moog
 Rutger Gunnarsson - bass
 Carlo Moghachi - mandolin
 Eva Dahlgren - vocals
 Totte Bergström - guitar

Charts

References

1979 albums
Ulf Lundell albums